{{Nihongo|Dragon Ball Z Hit Song Collection series|ドラゴンボールZ ヒット曲集|Doragon Bōru Zetto Hitto Kyokushū}} is a soundtrack series from the anime Dragon Ball Z. It was produced and released by Columbia Records in Japan only, from July 21, 1989 to March 20, 1996 the show's entire lifespan. The collection features a variety of theme songs, insert songs, image songs (songs inspired by the show.), character songs, instrumental suites, remixes, and medleys. On September 20, 2006, Columbia re-released the Hit Song Collection on their Animex 1300 series.

 List of albums 

Hit Song Collection

 is the first installment of the soundtrack series. It was released on July 21, 1989. This album contains the theme songs and several image songs popular among many fans. Also included on this collection is the insert song "Tenkaichi Gohan" from the first Dragon Ball Z film Ora no Gohan o Kaese!! know outside Japan as Dead Zone, and the song "Shura-Iro no Senshi", heard in the episode Yomigaeru Saiyan Densetsu! Gokū no Roots. The album cover features one of the rare images of Vegeta with his original anime color scheme.Track listing:Cha-La Head-Cha-La
Welcome to the Dragon World! ドラゴン・ワールドへようこそ! Doragon Wārudo e Yōkoso!
Mama is Wishing for Happiness ママは倖せ祈ってる Mama wa Shiawase Inotteru
He's That Damn Son Gokuあいつは孫悟空 Aitsu wa Son Gokū
Earth of Eternity 永遠の地球 Eien no Chikyū
Battle-Colors of the Warriors 修羅色の戦士 Shura-Iro no Senshi
 Burn, Dragon Soldiers! 燃えろ!ドラゴン・ソルジャーズ Moero! Doragon Sorujāzu
Trouble Surfing トラブル・サーフィン Toraburu Sāfin
The World's Greatest Gohan 天下-ゴハン Tenkaichi Gohan
Come Out, Incredible Zenkai Power! でてこいとびきりZENKAIパワー! Detekoi Tobikiri Zenkai Pawā!

Miracle Zenkai Power!!

 is the second installment of the soundtrack series. It was released on December 21, 1989. The album's title come from lyrics found in the Dragon Ball Z closing theme song "Detekoi Tobikiri Zenkai Power!".

This collection mainly contains collaborations by both Hironobu Kageyama and J-pop group Broadway. The group had previously collaborated with Kageyama on the second opening and closing theme songs from Saint Seiya, "Soldier Dream" and "Blue Dream" respectively. Include is the song "Fly High" which was used in the episode Gokū Pawā Zenkai!! Ginga no Hate made MuikakanTrack listing:Cha-La Head-Cha-La
No Common Sense At All ジョーシキなんてNA★I☆SA Jōshiki Nante NA*I*SA
A Big Serving of the Rice Boy 大盛り悟空(ライス・ボーイ) Ōmori Raisu Bōi
From Here on Earth 地球(ここ)から FROM THE HOME PLANET EARTH Koko Kara From the Home Planet Earth
Future Map 未来地図 Mirai Chizu
A Full Course Unrivaled in the World 天下無敵のフルコース Tenka-Muteki no Furukōsu
Fly High
All Alone
One Heart Light-Year 1 ♥ (one・heart) 光年 1 ♥ Kōnen
Come Out, Incredible Zenkai Power! でてこいとびきりZENKAIパワー! Detekoi Tobikiri Zenkai Pawā!

Space Dancing

 is the third installment of the soundtrack series. It was released on April 1, 1990. The album would peak at 56 on Oricon's Japanese album charts.

The album contains the standard television theme songs and six image songs, with four tracks performed by J-pop artist Kuko. Also featured are two songs from the second The World's Strongest, which are the Gohan image song "Piccolo-san Da~isuki♡" and the closing theme "Ikusa".Track listing:Cha-La Head-Cha-La
Dancing in the Space
Cosmic Chinese Melody
Good Night My Blue
Bad Boy
Sign of a Storm (Silent Noise) 嵐の前兆~無言のざわめき~ Arashi no Zenchō~Mugon no Zawameki~
Space Dance スペース・ダンス Supēsu Dansu
The Battle 戦(I・KU・SA) Ikusa (I-KU-SA)
I Lo~ve Mr. Piccolo♡ ピッコロさんだ~いすき♡ Pikkoro-san Da~isuki♡
Come Out, Incredible Zenkai Power! でてこいとびきりZENKAIパワー! Detekoi Tobikiri Zenkai Pawā!

Character SpecialDragon Ball Z Hit Song Collection IV: Character Special (ドラゴンボールZ ヒット曲集IV~キャラクターズ・スペシャル/Doragon Bōru Zetto Hitto Kyokushū Foru~Kyarakutāzu Supesharu) is the fourth installment of the soundtrack series. It was released on October 1, 1990. The album is composed mostly of character songs from the Dragon Ball Z cast, along with the song "Solid State Scouter" by Jpop band Tokio, heard in the Bardock TV special. It would go on to peak at 95 on Oricon's Japanese album charts.

Track listing:
Cha-La Head-Cha-La
Solid State Scouter ソリッドステート・スカウター Soriddo Sutēto Sukautā
The Healthy Polka お達者ポルカ O-tassha Poruka
Morning - Daytime - Night - You - Me アサ・ヒル・ヨル・キミ・ボク Asa - Hiru - Yoru - Kimi - Boku
Blow, Wind! Call Out, Shenlong!! 吹けよ風 呼べよ神龍(シェンロン)!! Fuke Yo Kaze Yobe Yo Shenron!!
If I Tell a Joke, It's an Exciting Fountain of Life!! シャレれば命の泉わくわく!! Sharereba Inochi no Izumi Waku-Waku!!
Energy of Ours 俺たちのエナジー Ore-tachi no Enajī
Two Heartly Soaked People 心から濡れた二人 Kokoro Kara Nureta Futari
The Girl is Acting Cruelly 女の子は罪作り On'na no Ko wa Tsumitsukuri
Come Out, Incredible Zenkai Power! でてこいとびきりZENKAIパワー! Detekoi Tobikiri Zenkai Pawā!

Journey of Light

 is the fifth installment of the soundtrack series. It was released on December 21, 1990.

This features remixes to the Dragon Ball opening theme "Makafushigi Adventure" and the closing theme to the third film The Tree of Might, "Marugoto". Also featured is the closing theme to the Bardock TV special, "Hikari no Tabi" which doubles as the title track to the album. As a result, much of the album's production art is made up of freeze frames from the TV special.

Track listing:
Journey of Light (Overture) 光の旅(オーヴァーチュア) Hikari no Tabi (Ōvāchua)
Mystical Adventure! (New Remix Long Version) 摩訶不思議アドベンチャー!(ニュー・リミックス・ロング・ヴァージョン) Makafushigi Adobenchā! (Nyū Rimikkusu Rongu Vājon)
Poetry of a Certain Star★ ある星の詩★ Aru Hoshi no Shi★
Happy Birthday
Cha-La Head-Cha-La (Space Version)  スペース・ヴァージョン Cha-La Head-Cha-La (Supēsu Vājon)
Planet to Planet
Gold-Colored Eggs 金色た・ま・ご Kin-Iro Ta-ma-go
The Whole World (New Remix Long Version) まるごと(ニュー・リミックス・ロング・ヴァージョン) Marugoto (Nyū Rimikkusu Rongu Vājon)
Doodlebug 蟻地獄 Arijigoku
The Spirit Road 魂の道 Tamashī no Michi
Poetry of a Certain Star★★ ある星の詩★★ Aru Hoshi no Shi★★
Journey of Light 光の旅 Hikari no Tabi
Come Out, Incredible Zenkai Power!! でてこいとびきりZENKAIパワー! Detekoi Tobikiri Zenkai Pawā!

BP∞ Battle Points Unlimited

 is the sixth installment of the soundtrack series. It was released on March 21, 1991. The album would go on to peak at 71 on Oricon's Japanese album charts.

The album comes off as a soundtrack for the fourth Dragon Ball Z film Lord Slug due to it containing production art plus two songs from the film the closing theme ""Ya" na Koto ni wa Genki-Dama!!" and "Kuchibue no Kimochi" a vocalized of Gohan's whistling melody which was originally performed by Hajime Ueshiba. The title track "BP∞ Battle Points Unlimited" is the instrumental insert that was played in episode 120 entitled Freeza wo Ittō Ryōdan!! Mō Hitori no Super Saiyan (Known as Another Super Saiyan? in the Funimation dub).

The Dragon Ondo or Dragon March is a song and dance. The album's booklet illustrated step-by-step instructions featuring Gohan demonstrating the dance.

Track listing:
Cha-La Head-Cha-La
BP∞ Battle Point Unlimited: Overture BP∞バトルポイント・アンリミテッド OVERTURE BP∞ Batoru Pointo Anrimiteddo Overture
Give a Genki-Dama at Bad Things!! 「ヤ」なことは元気玉!! "Ya" na Koto ni wa Genki-Dama!!
My Pace マイペース Mai Pēsu
Mai My Every Day マイ・My・毎日 Mai • My • Mainichi
Like a Machine...: Battling Machine 機械の様に…-バトリング・マシン- Kikai no Yō ni...--Batoringu Mashin--
BP∞ Battle Point Unlimited BP∞バトルポイント・アンリミテッド BP∞ Batoru Pointo Anrimiteddo
Fragments of a Dream 夢のｩけら Yume no Kakera
Dragon March ドラゴンONDO Doragon Ondo
Feeling of Whistling 口笛の気持ち Kuchibue no Kimochi
Come Out, Incredible Zenkai Power! でてこいとびきりZENKAIパワー! Detekoi Tobikiri Zenkai Pawā!

The Journey of the 7 Balls

 is the seventh installment of the soundtrack series. It was released on March 21, 1991. This album features a handful of instrumental tracks representing each Dragon Ball's journey after they are used to summon the dragon, as well as the closing theme to the fifth film Cooler's Revenge. It would go on to peak at 50 on Oricon's Japanese album charts.

Track listing:
Cha-La Head-Cha-La
The Journey of the 7TH. Ball《Overture》
The Incredible Mightiest vs. Mightiest とびっきりの最強対最強 Tobikkiri no Saikyō tai Saikyō
The Journey of the 1ST. Ball
Power of Smile パワー・オブ・スマイル Pawā obu Sumairu
The Journey of the 2ND. Ball
It’s Easy if you Close your Eyes 目を閉じればカンタン Me o Tojireba Kantan
The Journey of the 3RD. Ball
Like the Wind, Like the Stars «Part 1» 風の様に 星の様に《パート1》 Kaze no yō ni Hoshi no yō ni «Pāto Wan»
Like the Wind, Like the Stars «Part 2» 風の様に 星の様に《パート2》 Kaze no yô ni Hoshi no yô ni «Pāto Tzū»
The Journey of the 4TH. Ball
Somebody and Good Weather だれかさんといい天気 Dareka-san to Ii Tenki
The Journey of the 5TH. Ball
Beneath Time and Light 時と光の下で Toki to Hikari no Shita de
The Journey of the 6TH. Ball
Dragon Magic Carnival ドラゴン・マジック・カーニヴァル Doragon Majikku Kānibaru
The Journey of the 7TH. Ball
Come Out, Incredible Zenkai Power! でてこいとびきりZENKAIパワー!Detekoi Tobikiri Zenkai Pawā!

Character Special 2

 is the eighth installment of the soundtrack series. It was released on September 21, 1991. This album is a follow-up to the fourth installment to the series, titled Character Special, which was released in 1990. The album is made up of character songs from the Dragon Ball cast. It would go on to peak at 76 on Oricon's Japanese album charts.

The album initially picks up where the other character special leaves off. Each song in a way, tells their own unique story. "Capsule Corp." is simply Bulma making random comments about whatever she's doing. "Ichido wa Kekkon Shitai Mambo" features Kuririn singing cheerfully about how much he desires to get married. "Vegeta-sama no Oryori Jigoku!!" marks the only character song in the series, but not the last, by Vegeta. Here, he sings about cooking a special Okonomiyaki while giving "battle commands" to his ingredients who sing backup. "Share 'reba Inochi no Izumi Waku-Waku!! 2" is the follow-up to "Share 'reba Inochi no Izumi Waku-Waku!!" which is both performed by the northern Kaio-sama. Once again he continues to tell jokes that he only finds funny. By the end of the song he has succumbed to a fit of laughter. "Kuchibue no Kimochi Piccolo-Hen" is a follow-up to "Kuchibue no Kimochi", Gohan's whistling tune from movie four which was made into a character song for Gohan in Hit 6. This version is done from Piccolo's point of view. As established in movie four, Piccolo is sensitive to the sound whistling due to his adept hearing. As a result, for most of the song he complains and begs for the whistler to stop until he gives up and rockets away. Prompting an unidentified person to appear and comment on the chirping birds. "I•ke•na•i Oo-La-La Magic" features Chi-Chi forcing Gohan to take part in a mother-son karaoke duet as his and Goku's adventures has made Chi-Chi feel left out. Her plan is to compete in the local karaoke circuit with Gohan.

Despite its focus being on character songs, the album also features an image song by "Pochi featuring Apple Pie" called "Omoide no Tenkaichi Budokai". Which recalls the previous budokais in which Goku participated. Also included, the incidental piece "Takkaraputo Popporunga Pupiritto Paro" from episode 75, Nanatsu no Tama o Soroeshi Mono yo... Sā Aikotoba o Ie!, which serves as Porunga's summoning theme.

Track listing:
Cha-La Head-Cha-La
Capsule Corp.
The I-Want-to-Get-Married-For-Once Mambo 一度は結婚したいマンボ Ichido wa Kekkon Shitai Manbo
Lord Vegeta's Cooking Hell!! (The "Okonomiyaki" Recipe) ベジータ様のお料理地獄ー「お好み焼き」の巻ー Bejīta-sama no Oryōri Jigoku!!~"Okonomiyaki" no Kan~
Memories of the Tenkaichi Budokai 想い出の天下一武道会 Omoide no Tenkaichi Budōkai
If I Tell a Joke, It's an Exciting Fountain of Life!! 2 シャレれば命の泉わくわく!!2 Share 'reba Inochi no Izumi Waku-Waku!! Tzū
The Feeling of Whistling Piccolo Edit 口笛の気持ち・ピッコロ編Kuchibue no Kimochi • Pikkoro Hen
The Wrong Kind of Ooh-La-La Magic イ・ケ・ナ・イうららマジック I•ke•na•i Urara Majikku
Takkaraputo Popporunga Pupiritto Paro タッカラプトポッポルンガプピリットパロ
Come Out, Incredible Zenkai Power! でてこいとびきりZENKAIパワー! Detekoi Tobikiri Zenkai Pawā!

8½: Special

, despite its title, is the ninth installment of the soundtrack series. It was released on November 1, 1991. This album is one of two remix albums produced in the Hit Song Collection series, hence the ½ to the installment number.

Track listing:
Overture between 8 and 9
The Mysteries of Love  恋のNAZONAZO Koi no NazoNazo
《Super House Version》Welcome to the Dragon World! ドラゴン・ワールドへようこそ! 《Super House Version》Doragon Wārudo e Yōkoso!
《Super Watch-Me-Polish-Them Version》 Bad Boy 《Super 磨いてみてよ Version》Bad Boy 《Super Migai te mi te yo Version》Bad Boy
《Super Adventure Version》Cha-La Head-Cha-La
《Super House Version》Come Out, Incredible Zenkai Power! でてこいとびきりZENKAIパワー！ 《Super House Version》Detekoi Tobikiri Zenkai Pawā!
《Ultra New Edition》Kuko's Dance Medley
《Ultra New Edition》Kageyama's Power Medley
Soft Light, Gentle Gaze 素直な光 優しい視線 Sunao na Hikari Yasashī Shisen

Kuko's Dance Medley (Ultra New Edition):
Mama is Wishing for Happiness ママは倖せ祈ってる Mama wa Shiawase Inotteru
He's That Damn Son Goku あいつは孫悟空 Aitsu wa Son Gokū
Dancing in the Space
Cosmic Chinese Melody
Space Dance スペース・ダンス Supēsu Dansu
Power of Smile パワー・オブ・スマイル Pawā obu Sumairu

Kageyama's Power Medley (Ultra New Edition):
Battle-Color of Warriors 修羅色の戦士 Shura-Iro no Senshi
Give a Genki-Dama at Bad Things!! 「ヤ」なことには元気玉!! "Ya" na Koto ni wa Genki Dama!!
He's That Damn Son Goku あいつは孫悟空 Aitsu wa Son Gokū
The Spirit Road 魂の道 Tamashii no Michi
Battle 戦(I・KU・SA) Ikusa (I-ku-sa)
The Incredible Mightiest vs. Mightiest とびっきりの最強対最強 Tobikkiri no Saikyō tai Saikyō

Future Shock!!

, despite its title, is the tenth installment of the soundtrack series. It was released on November 1, 1991. The album would go on to peak at 75 on Oricon's Japanese album charts. Included is the song from episode 139 titled "Mind Power...Ki...", which was used in Trunks' flashback.

Track listing:
Cha-La Head-Cha-La
Mind Power...Ki... MIND POWER... 気...
A Message From the Future  未来からの伝言... Message From Future...Mirai Kara no Dengon...
Warning of Danger...Warning... 警告... Warning of Danger...Keikoku...
Welcome Home, My Boy...Name of The Wind... 風の名前... Welcome Home, My Boy...Kaze no Namae...
Super Power Melody 超力節... Super Purasu Power Ekuaruzu Melody...Chō-Ryoku-Bushi...
It’s a Small World...Beneath My Little Finger... 小指の下で... IT’S A SmallWorld...Koyubi no Shita de...
Sweet Lovely Midnight...The Other Side of The Moon... 月の裏側... Sweet Lovely Midnight...Tsuki no Uragawa...
White, the World, and the Heart 白と世界と心... White ando World ando True...Shiro to Sekai to Kokoro
Come Out, Incredible Zenkai Power! でてこいとびきりZENKAIパワー! Detekoi Tobikiri Zenkai Pawā!

Virtual Triangle

, despite its title, is the eleventh installment of the soundtrack series. It was released on March 21, 1992. The album would go to peak at 40 on the Oricon Japanese album charts. Included is song "Hero (Kimi ga Hero)" which was used as the closing to film The Return of Cooler.

Track listing:
Cha-La Head-Cha-La
Triangle 2
Hero (You’re the Hero) HERO(キミがヒーロー) Hero (Kimi ga Hīrō)
In That Sort of Mood そんな気分で Son’na Kibun de
Comet Library 流星図書館~コメットライブラリー Ryūsei Toshokan~Kometto Raiburarī
Good E[nergy] EなE E na E
Suite: Virtual Triangle
Keep My Way
Firefly Ho・Ta・Lu
Triangle 3
Awesome Energy イカしたエナジー Ikashita Enajī
Come Out, Incredible Zenkai Power! でてこいとびきりZENKAIパワー! Detekoi Tobikiri Zenkai Pawā!

The Room of "Mind and Time"

, despite its title, is the twelfth installment of the soundtrack series. It was released on July 1, 1992. The album would go on to peak at 82 on Oricon's Japanese album charts. Included is the song "Giri Giri—Sekai Kyokugen--", which was used as the closing theme to the film Super Android 13.

Track listing:
Cha-La Head-Cha-La
The Bug News 虫のしらせ Mushi no Shirase
Hypnosis Banana 催眠バナナ Saimin Banana
Brain Dance
At the Brink: The Earth's Limit GIRIGIRI-世界極限- Giri Giri—Sekai Kyokugen--
Twisted Spoon ねじれたスプーン Nejireta Supūn
Compass of Gold 黄金のコンパス Ōgon no Konpasu
Voice
X Spot X点 X Ten
Aquarium of Night アクアリウムの夜 Akuariumu no Yoru
A Top
Mad Magnets 狂った磁石 Kurutta Jishaku
Encyclopedia Fantasy 百科事典幻想曲 Hyakkajiten Gensōkyoku
Dream Upon a Star 星の見た夢 Hoshi no Mita Yume

DBZ a Go Go!!

, despite its title, is the thirteenth installment of the soundtrack series. It was released on September 21, 1992.

Track listing:
Cha-La Head-Cha-La
Please: Wish of a Lifetime!! Please Isshō no Onegai!!
Delight to you・・・
Go! Go! Go! On a Red Train LED TRAIN で GO!GO!GO! Led Train de GO!GO!GO!
SpacepeopleDBZ
Roller-Through 55 ローラー・スルー55 Rōrā Surū 55
Cool Cool Dandy Cool Cool ダンディ Cool Cool Dandi
Wild Dance Night 《Run At Full Speed Until Dawn》 夜明けまで突っ走れ Wild Dance Night《Yoake Made Tsuppashire》
Heartbreak Melody, For No Reason ハートブレイク・メロディ,みょうに Hātobureiku Merodi, Myō ni
《Super House Version》 Come Out, Incredible Zenkai Power! でてこい とびきり ZENKAIパワー! 《Super House Version》 Detekoi Tobikiri Zenkai Pawā!

Battle & Hope

, despite its title, is the fourteenth installment of the soundtrack series. It was released on December 21, 1992.

Included is the song "Unmei no Hi~Tamashī vs Tamashī", which was used in episode 184 for Gohan's Super Saiyan 2 explosion, and the song "Aoi Kaze no Hope" which was used as the closing theme to the Trunks TV special.

Track listing:
Cha-La Head-Cha-La
The Sounds of Battles to Come: Scene-1
Day of Destiny: Spirit vs. Spirit
The Sounds of Battles to Come: Scene-2
I'm a Positive Girl!!
The Sounds of Battles to Come: Scene-3
Children of the Dawn 夜明けの子供たち Yoake no Kodomo-tachi
The Sounds of Battles to Come: Scene-4
For ever～
The Sounds of Battles to Come: Scene-5
Challenge 挑戦状 Chōsenjō
The Sounds of Battles to Come: Scene-6
Don't be Unkind to it... イジワルしないでね Ijiwaru Shinai De Ne...
The Sounds of Battles to Come: Scene-7
Blue Wind of Hope 青い風のHOPE Aoi Kaze no Hope
Suite: The Sounds of Battles to Come
Come Out, Incredible Zenkai Power! でてこいとびきりZENKAIパワー! Detekoi Tobikiri Zenkai Pawā!

Straight

 despite its title is the fifteenth installment of the soundtrack series. It was released on March 21, 1993. Included is the song "Burning Fight—Nessen - Ressen - Chōgekisen--", which was used as the closing theme to the film Broly: The Legendary Super Saiyan.

Track listing:Cha-La Head-Cha-La
Burning Fight: a Close, Intense, Super-Fierce Battle バーニング・ファイト-熱戦・烈戦・超激戦- Bāningu Faito—Nessen - Ressen - Chōgekisen--
Water-Colored Aliens 水色星人 Mizu-Iro Seinin
Adventures Surrounding the Skies 空めぐる冒険 Sora Meguru Bōken
Something is... (Unknown Power) 何かが…(未知の力) Nanika ga... (Michi no Chikara)
Love Jet ラブ・ジェット Rabu Jetto
The Future That Came Back With the Trickster トリックスターと帰って来た未来 Torikkusutā to Kaettekita Mirai
I’m Straight, the Road is Straight 僕は,まっすぐ 道は,まっすぐ Boku wa, Massugu Machi wa, Massugu
Mother Universe マザー・ユニバース Mazā Yunibāsu
Come Out, Incredible Zenkai Power! でてこいとびきりZENKAIパワー! Detekoi Tobikiri Zenkai Pawā!

Sunlight & City Lights

, despite its title, is the sixteenth installment of the soundtrack series. It was released on July 21, 1993. This release has the distinction of being the last installment to include the first opening and closing theme song. Included is the song "Ginga o Koete Rising High", which used as the closing to the film Bojack Unbound.Track listing:Cha-La Head-Cha-La
Fly Away, Hero! 飛び出せ!ヒーロー Tobidase! Hīrō
Magician of Mine 私のMagician Watashi no Magician
Triangle of Stars 星のトライアングル Hoshi no Toraianguru
Sunlight & City Lights
The Sky, and Rain, and... 空と雨と… Sora to Ame to...
Let me Tell a Joke... Jokeぐらい言わせろよ Joke-Gurai Iwasero Yo...
My Song For You
Surpassing the Galaxy, Rising High 銀河を超えてライジング・ハイ Ginga o Koete Raijingu Hai
Fly Away, Hero! (Reprise) 飛び出せ!ヒーロー(reprise) Tobidase! Hīrō (reprise)
Come Out, Incredible Zenkai Power! でてこいとびきりZENKAIパワー Detekoi Tobikiri Zenkai Pawā!

We Gotta Power

 despite its title is the seventeenth installment of the soundtrack series. It was released on June 1, 1994. We Gotta Power is the second opening theme of Dragon Ball Z, replacing Cha-La Head-Cha-La from episode 200 until the end of the series.Track listing:We Gotta Power
Hey You, Crasher
Jumpin’ Jump!!
Stop, Time: My Name is Father 時よ止まれ~MY NAME IS FATHER~ Toki Yo Tomare~My Name is Father
Me, I Am a Magician 僕は魔法使い Boku wa Mahōtsukai
Fight Oh Fighting Road
Que Será ケ・セラ Ke Sera
It Is Silence...Afterward あとはSilence… Ato wa Silence...
Surpass Your Power 力を超えて Chikara o Koete
We Were Angels 僕達は天使だった Boku-tachi wa Tenshi Datta

Hippy Hoppy Shake!!

, despite its title, is the eighteenth installment of the soundtrack series. It was released on March 1, 1995.Track listing:We Gotta Power
Bring It On My Way ジャンジャカMy Way Janjaka My Way
This is Life!
Goodbye Mr. Loneliness: To the Other Side of the Light Good-Bye Mr.Loneliness~光の彼方へ~ Good-Bye Mr.Loneliness~Hikari no Kanata e~
A Ballad Dedicated to Majin Boo 魔人ブウに捧げるバラッド Majin Bū ni Sasageru Baraddo
Hooray for the End of the Century! 世紀末万歳! Seiki-Matsu Banzai!
Hippy Hoppy Shake!!
Ossan’s Dilemma
Goodbye, Tears! さらば涙よ Saraba Namida Yo
We Were Angels 僕達は天使だった Boku-tachi wa Tenshi Datta

Praise for the Future

 despite its title is the nineteenth installment of the soundtrack series. It was released on January 21, 1996. Included is the song "Ore ga Yaranakya Dare ga Yaru" which was used as the closing theme to the film Wrath of the Dragon.Track listing:We Gotta Power
Yesterday’s Dreams, Today’s Light: Silent Night, Morning Moon 昨日の夢、今日の光-サイレントナイト・モーニングムーン- Kinō no Yume, Kyō no Hikari—Sairento Naito Mōningu Mūn--
10,000,000,000 Friends 100億のフレンズ 100-Oku no Furenzu
Tragedy of Majin Boo 魔人ブウの悲劇 Majin Bū no Higeki
Memories: An Evening Without Him メモリーズ-奴のいない夜- Memorīzu—Yatsu no Inai Yoru--
If I Don’t Do It, Who Will? 俺がやらなきゃ誰がやる Ore ga Yaranakya Dare ga Yaru
Perfume No. 18 (Diabolical Fragrance) perfume N゜18~魔性の香り~ perfum No 18 ~Mashō no Kaori~
An Earth Within Your Eyes 瞳の中の地球 Hitomi no Naka no Chikyū
Growin’ Up: Until the Day We Can Meet Again Growin’ Up いつかまた逢える日まで… Growin’ Up Itsuka Mata Aeru Hi Made
We Were Angels 僕達は天使だった Boku-tachi wa Tenshi Datta

18½ Special: Super Remix

 is the final installment of the soundtrack series, released on March 20, 1996. Like its predecessor, Hit 8½, it is composed of remixes and medleys, but unlike 8½ it contains no exclusive songs.Track listing:Cha-La Head-Cha-La (Jungle Fever Mix)
Battle Spectacle Medley
For ever ’96 (Piano New Version)
At The Brink: The Earth's Limit (Extreme Hard Metal Mix) GIRI GIRI-世界極限-~EXTREME HARD METAL MIX Giri Giri—Sekai Kyokugen--~Extreme Hard Metal Mix~
Please: Wish of a Lifetime! (Acid Club Mix) Please Isshō no Onegai~Acid Club Mix~
Perfum No.18 (Dangerous Fragrance Mix)
Surpassing the Galaxy, Rising High (Galaxy Adventure Mix) 銀河を超えてライジング・ハイ~GALAXY ADVENTURE MIX~ Ginga o Koete Raijingu Hai ~Galaxy Adventure Mix~
Fly Away: Hero! (Dream Theater Mix) 飛び出せ!ヒーロー~DREAM THEATRE MIX~ Tobidase! Hīrō~Dream Theater Mix~
Journey of light '96 (Classical New Version) 光の旅’96~CLASSICAL NEW VERSION~ Hikari no Tabi '96~Classical New Version~Battle Spectacle Medley:Mind Power...Ki... MIND POWER-気-
Warning of Danger...Warning...WARNING OF DANGER-警告- Warning of Danger...Keikoku...
Challenge 挑戦状 Chōsenjō
Day of Destiny: Spirit vs. Spirit 運命の日-魂VS魂- Unmei no Hi~Tamashii VS Tamashii~

Never Ending Story

 is a two-disc CD soundtrack set. It was released on November 30, 1996.

This includes tracks considered fan favorites spanning all twenty of the Hit Song Collection Series. The first disc's tracklist is made up of fast-paced tracks, while the second disc's tracklist is made of soft ballads. An exclusive to this collection is the song "Kimi no Sora e".Disc One:He's That Damn Son Goku あいつは孫悟空 Aitsu wa Son Gokū
Happy Birthday
Power of Smile パワー・オブ・スマイル Pawā obu Sumairu
Mind Power...Ki... MIND POWER…気…
Hero (You’re the Hero) HERO~キミがヒーロー HERO (Kimi ga Hīrō)<
Brain Dance
SpacepeopleDBZ
Cool Cool Dandy Cool Cool ダンディ Cool Cool Dandi
Day of Destiny: Spirit vs. Spirit 運命の日~魂VS魂 Unmei no hi~Tamashī VS Tamashī
Children of the Dawn 夜明けの子供たち Yoake no Kodomo-tachi
Blue Wind of Hope 青い風のHOPE Aoi Kaze no HOPE
Surpassing the Galaxy, Rising High 銀河を超えてライジング・ハイ Ginga o Koete Raijingu Hai
Fly Away, Hero!: Reprise 飛び出せ!ヒーロー~リプライズ Tobidase! Hīrō~Ripuraizu
Growin’ Up: Until the Day We Can Meet Again... Growin'Up~いつかまた逢える日まで… Growin'Up~Itsuka Mata Aeru Hi Made...
Cha-La Head-Cha-La (Jungle Fever Mix)Disc Two:Earth of Eternity 永遠の地球 Eien no Chikyū
Good Night My Blue
Journey of Light 光の旅 Hikari no Tabi
Fragments of a Dream 夢のかけら Yume no Kakera
Beneath Time and Light 時と光の下で Toki to Hikari no Shita de
A Message From the Future 未来からの伝言… MESSAGE FROM FUTURE...Mirai Kara no Dengon...
White, the World, and the Heart 白と世界と心… WHITE & WORLD & TRUE...Shiro to Sekai to Kokoro...
Firefly HO・TA・LU
Compass of Gold 黄金のコンパス Ōgon no Konpasu
Aquarium of Night アクアリウムの夜 Akuariumu no Yoru
Dream Upon a Star 星の見た夢 Hoshi no Mita Yume
For ever~
Adventures Surrounding the Skies 空めぐる冒険 Sora Meguru Bōken
An Earth Within Your Eyes 瞳の中の地球 Hitomi no Naka no Chikyū
To Your Sky 君の空へ Kimi no Sora e

Dragon Ball Z Complete Song Collection
 is a CD soundtrack box set, released in 2003. The collection is made up of four three-disc volumes that span the entire Hit Song Collection series vocal track library. The collection also includes songs from some of the video game soundtracks (mainly Ultimate Battle 22 and Legends) and rare tracks that prior to this release were only available as bonus tracks on the 8mm singles of the closing themes to movies 10–13. This set is quite sought after by the Dragon Ball fans who missed out on owning the individual albums in the Hit Song Collection series. However many fans have bought this set despite already owning all of the Hit Song Collection albums. Individuals that do not own the Hit Song Collection or this set still got a little something out of this collection if they already own the Great Complete Collection.

Dragon Ball Z Complete Song Collection 1: Journey of Light

 is the first installment of the Dragon Ball Z Complete Song Collection. It was released on January 18, 2003. This set spans soundtracks 1-5 of the Hit Song Collection series and includes tracks from : Special.Disc One:CHA-LA HEAD-CHA-LA
ドラゴン・ワールドへようこそ!Doragon Wārudo e Yôkoso!/Welcome To The Dragon World!
ママは倖せ祈ってるMama wa Shiawase Inotte 'ru/Mom is Wishing for Happiness
あいつは孫悟空Aitsu wa Son Gokū/He's That Damn Son Goku
永遠の地球Eien no Chikyū/Earth of Eternity
修羅色の戦士Shura-Iro no Senshi/Battle-Colored Warriors
燃えろ!ドラゴン・ソルジャーズMoero! Doragon Sorujāzu/Burn, Dragon Soldiers!
トラブル・サーフィンToraburu Sāfin/Trouble Surfing
天下一ゴハンTenka-ichi Gohan/World's Greatest Gohan
ジョーシキなんてNA★I☆SAJôshiki Nante NA*I*SA/No Common Sense At All
大盛り悟空(ライス・ボーイ)Ômori Gohan (Raisu Boi)/A Big Serving of Gohan (Rice Boy)
地球(ここ)から FROM THE HOME PLANET EARTHKoko Kara FROM THE HOME PLANET EARTH/From Here on Earth
未来地図Mirai Chizu/Future Map
天下無敵のフルコースTenka-Muteki no Furukôsu/A Full Course Unrivaled on Earth
Fly high
ALL ALONE
1♥(one heart)光年1 ♥ Kônen/One Heart Light-YearDisc Two:Dancing in the space
Cosmic Chinese Melody
Good night my Blue
Bad Boy
嵐の前兆~無言のざわめき~Arashi no Zenchô~Mugon no Zawameki~/Sign of a Storm: Silent Noise
スペース・ダンスSupēsu Dansu/Space Dance
戦(I・KU・SA)Ikusa (I-KU-SA)/Battle
ピッコロさんだ~いすき♡Pikkoro-san Da~isuki♡/I Lo~ve Mr. Piccolo♡
ソリッドステート・スカウターSoriddo Sutēto Sukautā/Solid State Scouter
お達者ポルカO-tassha Poruka/The Healthy Polka
アサ・ヒル・ヨル・キミ・ボクAsa - Hiru - Yoru - Kimi - Boku/Morning - Daytime - Night - You - Me
吹けよ風 呼べよ神龍(シェンロン)!!Fuke Yo Kaze Yobe Yo Shenron!!/Blow, Wind! Call Out, Shenlong!!
シャレれば命の泉わくわく!!Share 'reba Inochi no Izumi Waku-Waku!!/If I Tell a Joke, It's an Exciting Fountain of Life!!
俺たちのエナジーOre-tachi no Enajī/Energy of Ours
心から濡れた二人Kokoro Kara Nureta Futari/Two Heartly Soaked People
女の子は罪作りOn'na no Ko wa TsumitsukuriThe Girl is Acting Cruelly
摩訶不思議アドベンチャー!(ニュー・リミックス・ロング・ヴァージョン) Makafushigi Adobenchā! <Nyû Rimikkusu Rongu Vājon>/Mystical Adventure! <New Remix Long Version>Disc Three:ある星の詩★Aru Hoshi no Shi★/Poetry of a Certain Star★
Happy Birthday
CHA-LA HEAD-CHA-LA(スペース・ヴァージョン)CHA-LA HEAD-CHA-LA (Supēsu Vājon)/CHA-LA HEAD-CHA-LA (Space Version)
金色た・ま・ごKin-Iro Ta-ma-go/Gold-Colored Eggs
まるごと(ニュー・リミックス・ロング・ヴァージョン)Marugoto (Nyū Rimikkusu Rongu Vājon)/The Whole World (New Remix Long Version)
蟻地獄Arijigoku/Doodlebug
魂の道Tamashii no Michi/Path of Souls
ある星の詩★★Aru Hoshi no Shi★★/Poetry of a Certain Star★★
光の旅Hikari no Tabi/Journey of Light
でてこいとびきりZENKAIパワー!Detekoi Tobikiri ZENKAI Pawā!/Come Out, Incredible ZENKAI Power!
恋のNAZONAZOKoi no NAZONAZO/The Mysteries of Love
ドラゴン・ワールドへようこそ!(Super House Version)Doragon Wārudo e Yôkoso!«Super House Version»/Welcome to the Dragon World! «Super House Version»
Bad Boy (Super磨いてみてよVersion)Bad Boy (Super Migaite Mite Yo Version) / Bad Boy (Super Watch-Me-Polish-Them Version)
CHA-LA HEAD-CHA-LA (Super Adventure Version)
KAGEYAMA'S POWER MEDLEY (Ultra New Edition)Medley Content:15.KAGEYAMA’S POWER MEDLEY (Ultra New Edition):
 修羅色の戦士
 Shura-Iro no Senshi/Battle-Color of Warriors
 「ヤ」なことには元気玉!!
 "Ya" na Koto ni wa Genki Dama!!/There’s a Genki-Dama in Bad Things!!
 あいつは孫悟空
 Aitsu wa Son Gokū/He’s That Damn Son Goku
 魂の道
 Tamashii no Michi/Path of Souls
 「ヤ」なことには元気玉!!
 "Ya" na Koto ni wa Genki Dama!!/There’s a Genki-Dama in Bad Things!!
 戦(I・KU・SA)
 Ikusa (I-KU-SA)/Battle
 とびっきりの最強対最強
 Tobikkiri no Saikyô tai Saikyô/Incredible Mightiest vs. Mightiest

Dragon Ball Z Complete Song Collection 2: Incredible Mightiest vs. Mightiest

 is the second installment of the Dragon Ball Z Complete Song Collection. It was released on February 21, 2003. This set spans soundtracks 6-10 of the Hit Song Collection series and includes tracks from : Special.Disc One:CHA-LA HEAD-CHA-LA
「ヤ」なことには元気玉!!"Ya" na Koto ni wa Genki-Dama!!/There's a Genki-Dama in Bad Things!!
マイペースMai Pēsu/My Pace
マイ・My・毎日Mai • My • Mainichi/Mai - My - Every Day
機械の様に...-バトリング・マシン-Kikai no Yô ni...--Batoringu Mashin--/Like a Machine...: Battling Machine
夢のかけらYume no Kakera/Fragments of Dreams
ドラゴンONDODoragon ONDO/Dragon March
口笛の気持ちKuchibue no Kimochi/The Feeling of Whistling
とびっきりの最強対最強Tobikkiri no Saikyô tai Saikyô/The Incredible Mightiest vs. Mightiest
パワー オブ スマイルPawā obu Sumairu/Power of Smile
目を閉じればカンタンMe o Tojireba Kantan/It's Easy If You Close Your Eyes
風の様に 星の様に(パート1)Kaze no Yô ni Hoshi no Yô ni (Pāto Wan)/Like the Wind, Like the Stars (Part 1)
風の様に 星の様に(パート2)Kaze no Yô ni Hoshi no Yô ni (Pāto Tzū)/Like the Wind, Like the Stars (Part 2)
だれかさんといい天気Dareka-san to Ii Tenki/Somebody and Good Weather
時と光の下でToki to Hikari no Shita de/Beneath Time and Light
ドラゴン マジック カーニバルDoragon Majikku Kānibaru/Dragon Magic CarnivalDisc Two:Capsule Corp.Capsule Corporation
一度は結婚したいマンボIchido wa Kekkon Shitai Manbo/The I-Want-to-Get-Married-For-Once Mambo
ベジータ様のお料理地獄!!~「お好み焼き」の巻~Bejīta-sama no O-ryôri Jigoku!!~"Okonomiyaki" no Kan~/Lord Vegeta's Cooking Hell!!: The "Okonomiyaki" Recipe
想い出の天下一武道会Omoide no Tenkaichi Budôkai/Memories of The Tenkaichi Budôkai
シャレれば命の泉わくわく!!2Share 'reba Inochi no Izumi Waku-Waku!! Tzū/If I Tell a Joke, It's an Exciting Fountain of Life!! 2
口笛の気持ち・ピッコロ編Kuchibue no Kimochi • Pikkoro Hen/The Feeling of Whistling: Piccolo Edit
イ・ケ・ナ・イうららマジックI•ke•na•i Urara Majikku/The Wrong Kind of Ooh-La-La Magic
Mind Power...気...Mind Power...Ki.../Mind Power...Energy...
Message From Future...未来からの伝言...Message From Future...Mirai Kara no Dengon.../A Message From the Future
Warning of Danger...警告...WARNING OF DANGER...Keikoku.../Warning of Danger...Warning...
Welcome Home, My Boy...風の名前...Welcome Home, My Boy...Kaze no Namae.../Welcome Home, My Boy...The Name of The Wind...
Super+Power=Melody...超力節...Super Purasu Power Ekuaruzu Melody...Chô-Ryoku Fushi.../Super Power Melody
It's a Small WorldIt's a Small World...Koyubi no Shita de.../It's a Small World...Beneath My Little Finger...
Sweet Lovely Midnight...月の裏側...Sweet Lovely Midnight...Tsuki no Uragawa.../Sweet Lovely Midnight...the Other Side of the Moon...
White & World & True...白と世界と心...White & World & True...Shiro to Sekai to Kokoro/White, the World, and the HeartDisc Three:Hero (キミがヒーロー)Hero (Kimi ga Hīrō)/Hero (You're the Hero)
そんな気分でSon'na Kibun de/In That Sort of Mood
流星図書館~コメットライブラリー~Ryūsei Toshokan~Kometto Raiburarî~/Comet Library
EなEE na E/Good E[nergy]
Keep my way
HO・TA・LUFirefly
イカしたエナジーIkashita Enajī/Awesome Energy
でてこいとびきりZenkai パワー!(Ultra New Edition)Detekoi Tobikiri Zenkai Pawā!/Come Out, Incredible Zenkai Power! (Ultra New Edition)
Kuko's Dance Medley (Ultra New Edition)
素直な光 優しい視線Sunao na Hikari Yasashī Shisen/Soft Light, Gentle Gaze
光の旅'96 (Classicl New Version)Hikari no Tabi '96 (Classical New Version)/Journey of Light '96 (Classical New Version)Medley Content:9. Kuko's Dance Medley (Ultra New Edition):
 ママは倖せ祈ってる
 Mama wa Shiawase Inotte ’ru/Mom is Wishing for Happiness
 あいつは孫悟空
 Aitsu wa Son Gokū/He's That Damn Son Goku
 Dancing in the space
 Cosmic Chinese Melody
 スペース・ダンス
 Supēsu Dansu/Space Dance
 パワー・オブ・スマイル
 Pawā obu Sumairu/Power of Smile

Dragon Ball Z Complete Song Collection 3: Fly Away! Hero

 is the third installment of the Dragon Ball Z Complete Song Collection. It was released on March 21, 2003.This set spans soundtracks 11-15 of the Hit Song Collection series and includes tracks from : Special.Disc One:CHA-LA HEAD-CHA-LA
催眠バナナSaimin BananaHypnosis Banana
Brain Dance
GIRIGIRI-世界極限-GIRI GIRI—Sekai Kyokugen--/At the Brink: The Earth's Limit
黄金のコンパスÔgon no Konpasu/Compass of Gold
VOICE
アクアリウムの夜Akuariumu no Yoru/Aquarium of Night
KOMAA Top
星の見た夢Hoshi no Mita Yume/Dream Upon a Star
PLEASE~ISSHOU NO ONEGAI!Please: Wish of a Lifetime!
Delight to you...
LED TRAIN でGO!GO!GO!Go! Go! Go! on a Red Train
spacepeople DBZ
roller-through 55
Cool Cool ダンディCool Cool Dandi/Cool Cool Dandy
WILD DANCE NIGHT(夜明けまで突っ走れ)WILD DANCE NIGHT (Yoake Made Tsuppashire)/Wild Dance Night (Run at Full Speed Until Dawn)Disc Two:ハートブレイク・メロディ,みょうにHātobureiku Merodi, Myô ni/Heartbreak Melody, For No Reason
でてこいとびきりZENKAIパワー!(Super House Version)Detekoi Tobikiri ZENKAI Pawā! (Super House Version)/Come Out, Incredible ZENKAI Power! (Super House Version)
運命の日~魂vs魂~Unmei no Hi~Tamashii tai Tamashii~/Day of Destiny: Spirit vs. Spirit
I'm a positive girl!!
夜明けの子供たちYoake no Kodomo-tachi/Children of The Dawn
FOR EVER~
挑戦状Chôsenjô/Challenge
イジワルしないでね...Ijiwaru Shinai De Ne.../Don't Be Mean...
青い風のHOPEAoi Kaze no HOPE/Blue Wind of Hope
バーニング・ファイト-熱戦・烈戦・超激戦-Bāningu Faito—Nessen - Ressen - Chôgekisen--/Burning Fight: a Close, Intense, Super-Fierce Battle
水色星人Mizu-Iro Seinin/Water-Colored Aliens
空めぐる冒険Sora Meguru Bôken/Adventures Surrounding The Skies
何かが...(未知の力)Nanika ga... (Michi no Chikara)/Something is... (Road of Power)
ラブ・ジェットRabu JettoLove Jet
トリックスターと帰って来た未来Torikkusutā to Kaettekita MiraiThe Future that Came Back With the Trickster
僕は,まっすぐ 道は,まっすぐBoku wa, Massugu Machi wa, Massugu/I'm Straight, the Road is Straight
マザー・ユニバースMazā Yunibāsu/Mother UniverseDisc Three:飛び出せ!ヒーローTobidase! Hīrō/Fly Away! Hero
私のMagicianWatashi no Magician/Magician of Mine
星のトライアングルHoshi no Toraianguru/A Triangle of Stars
空と雨と...Sora to Ame to.../The Sky, and Rain, and...
Jokeぐらい言わせろよ...Joke-Gurai Iwasero Yo.../I'm Only Joking!...
My song for you
銀河を超えてライジング・ハイGinga o Koete Raijingu Hai/Surpassing the Galaxy, Rising High
飛び出せ!ヒーロー(reprise)Tobidase! Hīrō (reprise)/Fly Away! Hero (reprise)
でてこいとびきりZENKAIパワー!Detekoi Tobikiri ZENKAI Pawā!!/Come Out, Incredible ZENKAI Power!!
CHA-LA HEAD-CHA-LA~JUNGLE FEVER MIX~
FOR EVER~'96~PIANO NEW VERSION~
GIRIGIRI-世界極限-~EXTREME HARD METAL MIX~GIRIGIRI—Sekai Kyokugen--~EXTREME HARD METAL MIX~/At the Brink: The Earth's Limit: Extreme Hard Metal Mix
PLEASE~ISSHOU NO ONEGAI!~ACID CLUB MIX~Please: Wish of a Lifetime!: Acid Club Mix
perfum N°18~DANGEROUS FRAGRANT MIX~
銀河を超えてライジング・ハ~GALAXY ADVENTURE MIX~Ginga o Koete Raijingu Hai~GALAXY ADVENTURE MIX~/Surpassing the Galaxy, Rising High: Galaxy Adventure Mix
飛び出せ!ヒーロー~DREAM THEATRE MIX~Tobidase! Hīrō (DREAM THEATRE MIX)/Fly Away! Hero (Dream Theatre Mix)

Dragon Ball Z Complete Song Collection 4: Promise of Eternity

 is the final installment of the Dragon Ball Z Complete Song Collection. It was released on April 23, 2003. This set spans soundtracks 16-# of the Hit Song Collection series and includes vocal tracks from the soundtracks to the PlayStation video games and the bonus tracks up till now were only available on the 8mm CD singles of the closing theme to DBZ movies 10-13, plus three related songs from Akira Toriyama: The World making this volume quite sought after by many collectors.Disc One:We Gotta Power
Hey You, Crasher
Jumpin'Jump!!
時よ止まれ~My Name Is Father~Toki Yo Tomare~My Name Is Father~/Stop, Time!: My Name is Father
僕は魔法使いBoku wa Mahôtsukai/I'm a Magician
Fight Oh Fighting Road
ケ・セラKe Sera/Que Será (What Will Be)
あとはSilence...Ato wa Silence.../Afterward, There's Silence...
力を超えてChikara o Koete/Surpass Your Power
ジャンジャカMy WayJanjaka My Way/Bring it On My Way
This Is Life!
Good-Bye Mr. Loneliness~光の彼方へ~Good-Bye Mr. Loneliness~Hikari no Kanata e~/Goodbye, Mr. Loneliness: to the Other Side of the Light
魔人ブウに捧げるバラッドMajin Buu ni Sasageru BaraddoA Ballad Dedicated to Majin Boo
世紀末万歳!Seiki-Matsu Banzai!/Hooray For the End of the Century!
Hippy Hoppy Shake!!
Ossan's Dilemma
さらば涙よSaraba Namida Yo/Goodbye, Tears!Disc Two:昨日の夢,今日の光-サイレントナイト・モーニングムーン-Kinô no Yume, Kyô no Hikari—Sairento Naito - Môningu Mūn--/Yesterday's Dreams, Today's Light: Silent Night, Morning Moon
100億のフレンズ100-Oku no Furenzu10,000,000,000 Friends
魔人ブウの悲劇Majin Buu no HigekiTragedy of Majin Boo
メモリーズ-奴のいない夜-Memorīzu—Yatsu no Inai Yoru--/Memories: An Evening Without Him
perfum N゜18~魔性の香り~perfum No 18 ~Mashô no Kaori~/Perfume No. 18: Diabolical Fragrance
瞳の中の地球Hitomi no Naka no Chikyū/An Earth Within Your Eyes
Growin'Up いつかまた逢える日まで...Growin' Up Itsuka Mata Aeru Hi Made/Growin' Up: Until the Day We Can Meet Again
僕達は天使だったBoku-tachi wa Tenshi Datta/We Use to be Angels
プラス・アルファ(+α)Purasu Arufa (+α)/Plus Alpha
ここにおいでよKoko ni Oide YoCome On Over Here!
自然の合図Shizen no AizuSigns of Nature
まるごとMarugotoThe Whole World
Battle Spectacle MedleyDisc Three:奇蹟のビッグ・ファイトKiseki no Biggu Faito/Big Fight of Miracals
ドラゴンボールの伝説Doragonbōru no Densetsu/Dragon Ball of Legend
ドラゴンパワー∞(むげんだい)Doragon Pawā ∞ (Mugendai)/Dragon Power ∞ (Infinity)
 小さな戦士(悟天とトランクスのテーマ)Chīsa na Senshi (Goten to Torankusu no Tēma)/The Young Warriors (Theme of Goten and Trunks)
最強のフュージョンSaikyô no Fyūjon/Mightiest of Fusion
 愛はバラードのように(ベジータのテーマ)Ai wa Barādo no Yô ni (Bejīta no Tēma)/Love is Like a Ballad (Theme of Vegeta)
俺がやらなきゃ誰がやるOre ga Yaranakya Dare ga Yaru/If I Don't Do It, Who Will?
勇者の笛(タピオンのテーマ)Yūsha no Fue (Tapion no Tēma)/Ocarina of The Brave Man (Theme of Tapion)
永遠の約束(デュエット・ヴァージョン)Eien no Yakusoku (Dyuetto Vājon)/Promise of Eternity: (Duet Version)
光の Willpower (ヴォーカル・ヴァージョン)Hikari no WILL POWER (Vōkaru Vājon)/Light of Willpower (Vocal Version)
涙みたいな雨が降るNamida-Mitai na Ame ga Furu/The Rain That's Falling Looks Like Tears
灼熱のファイティング(ヴォーカル・ヴァージョン)Endingu Tēma~Shakunetsu no Faitingu( Vōkaru Vājon)Ending Theme: Red-Hot Fighting (Vocal Version)
まひるの闇(ヴォーカル・ヴァージョン)Mahiru no Yami (Vōkaru Vājon)/Darkness of Midday (Vocal Version)
Sign ~兆~(ヴォーカル・ヴァージョン)SIGN ~Chô~ (Vōkaru Vājon)/Sign: An Omen (Vocal Version)
Fire of Black~黒い炎~(ヴォーカル・ヴァージョン)Fire of Black~Kuroi Honō~ (Vōkaru Vājon)/Fire of Black: Black Flame (Vocal Version)
Never Ending, Never Give Up (ヴォーカル・ヴァージョン)Never Ending, Never Give Up (Vōkaru Vājon)/Never Ending, Never Give Up (Vocal Version)
君の空へKimi no Sora e/To Your SkyMedley Content:'''
2. Battle Spectacle Medley:
 Mind Power-気-
 Mind Power...Ki.../Mind Power...Energy... Warning of Danger-警告-
 Warning of Danger...Keikoku.../Warning of Danger...Warning... 挑戦状
 Chôsenjô/Challenge 運命の日-魂VS魂-
 Unmei no Hi ~Tamashii VS Tamashii~/Day of Destiny: Spirit vs. Spirit''

References 

Hit Song Collection Series
Columbia Records soundtracks
Japanese-language albums